Leif Håkan Ingemar Engqvist (born 30 July 1962) is a Swedish former footballer who played as a midfielder. During his career he played for Lunds BK, Malmö FF and Trelleborgs FF. He earned 18 caps for the Sweden national football team, and participated in the 1990 FIFA World Cup. He also took part in the 1988 Summer Olympics.

Career statistics

International

References

External links

1962 births
Living people
Swedish footballers
Sweden international footballers
Olympic footballers of Sweden
Footballers at the 1988 Summer Olympics
1990 FIFA World Cup players
Allsvenskan players
Lunds BK players
Trelleborgs FF players
Malmö FF players
Association football midfielders